Sheikh Fazlul Haque Moni                  (4 December 1939 – 15 August 1975) was a Bangladeshi politician. He was one of the nephews of Bangabandhu Sheikh Mujibur Rahman the founding father of Bangladesh. He was the founder of Mujib Bahini Bangladesh Liberation Force-BLF  one of the major guerrilla forces of the Bangladesh Liberation War and also the founder of Bangladesh Awami Jubo League, the youth wing of Bangladesh Awami League.

Early life
Mani was born in Tungipara, Gopalganj District on 4 December 1939. He studied in Nabakumar Institution in Dhaka. Later, he studied at Jagannath College (HSC, 1958) and BM College (BA, 1960).

Career
Mani was the founding chairman of the Jubo League. Later he served as general secretary of the then East Pakistan Chhatra League from 1960 to 1964. His contribution to spearhead the historic student movement against autocratic ruler Ayub Khan’s military regime produced an immense effect. He played a pivotal role during the six-point movement in 1966. He was a student leader and general secretary of Student League. In the first week of April 1971 he along with three other Awami League leaders escaped to Kolkata. The leaders were Tofael Ahmed, Abdur Razzak and Shirazul Alam Khan. They organized the Mukti Bahini in India to liberate Bangladesh. Mani and P. N. Banerji, then joint director of Research and Analysis Wing (east), set up the Mujib Bahini as a counterbalance to former East Pakistan army officers in the Mukti Bahini. Members of the Mujib Bahini would go on to form the Jatiya Rakkhi Bahini. He took part in the war of liberation in 1971 as the commander, without any military training, of the Bangladesh Liberation Front. He initially supported the formation of a revolutionary council instead of an interim government which was against the wishes of Tajuddin Ahmed. He eventually had to give up on that and the interim government was formed. He was considered part of the inner circle of President Mujibur and was seen as loyal to Mujibur. This was the reason given for his assassination. Mani was the author of several novels, one of which was later made into a film Obanchita.

Mani was the founder of the daily newspaper Dainik Banglar Bani.

Death
Mani, along with his wife Arzu Moni, was killed during the Assassination of Sheikh Mujibur Rahman in a military coup on 15  August 1975. He lived two kilometers away from Mujibur in Dhanmondi. The attack on his house was witnessed by Mahfuz Anam, who is the editor as well as the publisher of The Daily Star, whose house was on the opposite side of the lake from Mani's house. His two sons - Fazle Noor Taposh, now the mayor of Dhaka South City Corporation, and Sheikh Fazle Shams Parash, an academician by profession - survived the attack, as they were hiding under a bed. His wife, who was thought to be pregnant, was also killed.

Taposh was three years and eight months old then, while Parash was around five years. Taposh was elected to the Jatiya Sangsad (National Parliament) in the 2008 Bangladeshi general election from the Dhaka-12 constituency. He was elected Mayor of DSCC in the 2020 Dhaka South City Corporation election. Parash currently holds the position of chairman of the Jubo League.

Legacy
The Shahid Sheikh Moni Memorial International Chess Tournament, which was held in Dhaka, Bangladesh in 2015, was named in his memory. An auditorium in Gopalganj, Bangladesh was named after him.

Criticism
Mani was given lucrative positions in the government formed by Sheikh Mujib. When private trade with India was banned due to slow inflation, Mani actively engaged in it with Mujib's blessings. This was seen as an attempt by Mujib to form a dynasty.

References

1939 births
1975 deaths
Assassination of Sheikh Mujibur Rahman
Assassinated Bangladeshi politicians
People murdered in Bangladesh
Recipients of the Independence Day Award
Sheikh Mujibur Rahman family
Mukti Bahini personnel
Deaths by firearm in Bangladesh
Bangladesh Krishak Sramik Awami League executive committee members
Bangladesh Krishak Sramik Awami League central committee members
1975 murders in Bangladesh